Saint-Silvain-sous-Toulx (literally Saint-Silvain under Toulx; Auvergnat: Sant Sauve de Tol) is a commune in the Creuse department in central France.

Population

See also
Communes of the Creuse department

References

Communes of Creuse